Best of Bish is the first compilation album by singer/songwriter Stephen Bishop. It was released by Rhino Records in 1988.

History
Best of Bish collects nine tracks from Bishop's first three studio albums, including hits "On and On" and "Save It for a Rainy Day", with six tracks from motion pictures and other sources, some previously unavailable.

Hit "It Might Be You", from the 1982 film Tootsie, peaked at No. 25 on the Billboard singles chart, Bishop's first appearance there in four years. "If Love Takes You Away" is from the 1982 film Summer Lovers, whose soundtrack only appeared on LP, and "Unfaithfully Yours" came from the 1984 film of the same name, whose soundtrack was never released.

"Fallin'", "Someone's In Love" and "Separate Lives", a hit for Phil Collins and Marilyn Martin from the 1985 film White Nights, were recorded for the album Sleeping with Girls, a Stephen Bishop album which was never released in the United States.

Both "It Might Be You" and "Separate Lives" were nominated for Academy Awards for Best Original Song.

Track listing
All songs written by Stephen Bishop, except where noted.

References

1988 greatest hits albums
Stephen Bishop (singer) albums
Albums produced by Gus Dudgeon
Albums produced by Tommy LiPuma
Albums produced by Russ Titelman
Rhino Records compilation albums